This article lists all Presidents of the National Union of Students in the United Kingdom.

References

National Union of Students (United Kingdom)
President